Acquaviva (literally "living water") is one of the 9 communes or castelli of San Marino.

Geography
It has 2,145 inhabitants (May 2018) in an area of 4.86 km2. It borders the San Marino municipalities Borgo Maggiore and San Marino and the Italian municipalities San Leo and Verucchio.

In its territory there are two significant sites for San Marino. The first, the rock of Baldasserona, is considered the location of the Titan where he stopped for the first time Saint Marino. In the rock which is in fact a large fissure, is considered the first refuge of the founder of San Marino. In fact, for San Marino, it is precisely at this point that began their history. 
Another place that has marked the history of San Marino is Mount Cerreto. At the foot of the hill, was the information with which the Saint baptized the first Christians of the Titano community, and hence the name of "Acquaviva". 
Finally, historical documents attest that "the Cerreto Castello di Monte", identified with Acquaviva, in 885 was issued the "Placito Feretrano", the oldest document of the Republic of San Marino.

Economy
The town, as of 30 June 2014, has 324 companies, 100 of these are business, 72 are manufacturing and 66 are the commercial field.

History
It was annexed to San Marino in 1243.

Parishes
Acquaviva is subdivided into two parishes (curazie):
Gualdicciolo 
La Serra

References

External links

 
Municipalities of San Marino